The ligamentum venosum, also known as Arantius' ligament, is the fibrous remnant of the ductus venosus of the fetal circulation. Usually, it is attached to the left branch of the portal vein within the porta hepatis. It may be continuous with the round ligament of liver.

It is invested by the peritoneal folds of the lesser omentum within a fissure on the visceral/posterior surface of the liver between the caudate and main parts of the left lobe.

It is grouped with the liver in Terminologia Anatomica.

See also 

 Ligamentum teres
 Ligamentum arteriosum

References

External links
 

Abdomen
Ligaments